"The Fruit at the Bottom of the Bowl" is a short story by Ray Bradbury. It was first published in Detective Book Magazine in November 1948 (cover date: Winter) as "Touch and Go". The story was re-titled and published as "The Fruit at the Bottom of the Bowl" in EQMM in January 1953.

Plot summary
Mr. Acton begins the story standing over the body of Mr. Huxley, whom he has just killed. While attempting to cover up his tracks, he has flashbacks of his encounters with Mr. Huxley, with whom he is having an altercation over a woman. These flashbacks reveal to the murderer that there are more and more of his fingerprints all over the man's house, because he thought that he had touched so many different objects. His frenzy to remove all of the evidence distracts him from his actual objective, to get away with the crime. He is eventually caught, after polishing the entire house, while polishing and re-polishing the glass fruit at the bottom of a bowl.

References

Publication history
The story was included in several of Bradbury's short story collections:
 The Golden Apples of the Sun, 1953
 The Vintage Bradbury, 1965
 Twice 22, 1966
 A Song Of Thunder and Other Stories, 2005

Adaptations in other media
This story was adapted to the EC comic book Crime SuspenStories #17 (April–May 1953) as "Touch and Go" by Johnny Craig. It was adapted as an episode of the television series The Ray Bradbury Theater (January 23, 1988) as "The Fruit at the Bottom of the Bowl" with Michael Ironside and Robert Vaughn.

External links
 

1948 short stories
Short stories by Ray Bradbury
Crime short stories
Works originally published in Detective Book Magazine